Billy Mittakarin Ogan (July 29, 1966) is a Thai actor, singer, composer and writer.

Personal life 
Ogan was born to a Filipino father and a Thai mother. He started his modeling career in 1985 and in 1987 he released his debut solo album "Billy Billy" on GMM Grammy. His second and third albums were more successful.

In 1995 he married actress Sirium Pakdeedumrongrit. They had one daughter before they divorced in 2001.

Filmography 

 1995 Oh Mada
 1996 Tong Nung 111
 1998 Destiny Upside Down
 1998 Khwamrak Kap Ngoentra (Love and Money)
 2002 Sasan Khon Pen
 2012 An Ordinary Love Story
 2015 Tawan Tud Burapha
 2018 Look Mai Lai Sontaya

Concertography 

 Amphol Meung Dee Gub Billy Khem 2005
 Micro: Rock Lek Lek RETURNs, 2010

Awards and nominations 

 Thailand National Film Association Awards - Best Supporting Actor Billy Ogan
 Cinemag Spirit Awards 2 - Best Supporting Actor Billy Ogan

References 

1966 births
Living people
Billy Ogan
Billy Ogan
Billy Ogan
Billy Ogan
Billy Ogan
Billy Ogan
Billy Ogan
Billy Ogan